Brian John Masters (17 October 1932–23 September 1998) was a British Anglican bishop in the Church of England. He was the Bishop of Fulham and then the area Bishop of Edmonton.

Masters was educated at Collyer's School, Horsham, and Queens' College, Cambridge, before beginning his ordained ministry as a curate at St Dunstan and All Saints in Stepney, after which he was the vicar of Holy Trinity with St Mary's Hoxton before his ordination to the episcopate. He died in office while Bishop of Edmonton in September 1998, aged 65.

References

1932 births
Alumni of Worcester College, Oxford
Bishops of Fulham
Bishops of Edmonton (London)
People educated at The College of Richard Collyer
20th-century Church of England bishops
1998 deaths
Alumni of Queens' College, Cambridge